Badenjan (also Romanized as Bādenjān; also known as Badinjān and Deh-e Bādenjān) is a village in Posht Par Rural District, Simakan District, Jahrom County, Fars Province, Iran. At the 2006 census, its population was 293, in 72 families.

References 

Populated places in Jahrom County